Howle is a surname. Notable people with this name include:
Billy Howle (born 1989), British actor
C. Tycho Howle, American businessman, founder of Harbinger Corp.
Danielle Howle, American singer-songwriter
Emmet Howle, American college football player for 2015 The Citadel Bulldogs football team
Jeff Howle, American educator, principal of Academy of Technology, Engineering, Mathematics, and Science in Abilene, Texas
John Howle, American college football player, starred in 1954 Sun Bowl
Leslie Howle, American writing workshop administrator, two-time nominee for World Fantasy Special Award—Non-professional
Lt. P. W. Howle Jr., American naval officer, commanded USS Improve (AM-247)
Ryan Howle, British game show contestant on Britain's Best Brain
Ty Howle, American college football player for 2013 Penn State Nittany Lions football team
Victoria Howle, American mathematician
Walker Howle, American rock musician for Dead Confederate

See also
Carmen Howle, fictional character in list of Tracy Beaker Returns characters
Howell (name)
Howl (disambiguation)